Thinking with Time Machine is a single-player mod for Portal 2 developed by Stridemann, and released by SignHead Studio. It was initially released to Steam in April 2014, for Microsoft Windows, and OS X systems, available freely to existing owners of Portal 2.

Gameplay 

In Thinking with Time Machine, the player controls Chell, the protagonist of the official Portal games. In addition to the series' "portal gun", it also gives the player a tablet-like "time machine", allowing them to record their movements, and summon a double who performs those motions. The player can only use a single recording at a time, with previous recordings being deleted when a new action is taken. Recordings can perform all the actions a normal player can, and the player can also stand on their recording, allowing them to reach higher surfaces.

Most of Portal 2'''s testing elements are included in the mod, with new mechanics being taught through an instruction board.

 Release and reception Thinking with Time Machine was released for free to existing owners of Portal 2 via Steam on 18 April 2014 by developer Stridemann and publisher SignHead Studio. It was one of the top 200 Steam games in the year of its release.

The game was received positively by multiple PC gaming reviewers. Alice O'Connor of Rock, Paper, Shotgun positive in a positive 2014 review "for those lacking in some of the social niceties, it’s perhaps the closest we’ll get to playing Portal 2 co-op.” PC Gamer'' reviewer Christopher Livingston similarly praised the mod, stating that "working with your past self will seem almost as natural as working with a co-op partner". Though writer for Wired Bo Moore praised the overall design of the puzzles, he noted that some lacked "Valve polish".  Additionally, both Moore and Livingston criticised the mod for not featuring enough portal-based puzzles, especially in initial levels.

References

External links
 Thinking with Time Machine Steam Page

2014 video games
Fangames
Linux games
MacOS games
Puzzle video games
Platform games
Video games developed in Ukraine
Windows games
Source (game engine) mods